The 1962 World Rowing Championships were the inaugural world championships in rowing. The competition was held in September 1962 on the Rotsee in Lucerne, Switzerland. Rowers from West Germany dominated the competition, winning five of the seven boat classes.

Background
The Fédération Internationale des Sociétés d'Aviron (FISA) decided in 1961 that, like at the Olympics, rowers from the whole world should compete for a championship title; thus far, they had only organised the European Rowing Championships, although they were open to rowers from outside of Europe. Prior to the 1974 World Rowing Championships, only men competed. Seven boat classes were part of the inaugural world championships that was held from 6 to 9 September on the Swiss Rotsee. There were 401 competitors from 24 countries (counting East and West Germany as one country) with 107 boats at the competition. Between 13 (double scull) and 17 (coxless pair) competed per boat class.

German rowers

FISA did not recognise East Germany, hence only one German crew was permitted per event. Selection trials between East and West German crews were held on 3 September on the Rotsee, three days before the start of the championships. As was predicted by East German media outlets, West German crews would win in six of the seven categories, with 1960 Olympic single scull silver medal winner Achim Hill the only successful East German qualifier, beating Edgar Heidorn from Hanover. During the world championships, Hill did not proceed beyond the heats, though.

Medal summary
Medalists at the 1962 World Rowing Championships:

Men's events

Event codes

Medal table 

The countries that did compete but did not win medals were Denmark and the Netherlands (they had entered 7 boats each), Czechoslovakia (6 boats), Norway and Poland (5 boats each), Belgium, Japan and Sweden (4 boats each), Australia, Finland and Canada (3 boats each), Israel, Yugoslavia, and Hungary (2 boats each), and New Zealand and Portugal (1 boat each).

Finals

References

World Rowing Championships
Rowing
Rowing
Sport in Lucerne
World Rowing Championships
Rowing
Rowing